Trethurgy is a village in the parish of Treverbyn, Cornwall, England, United Kingdom. It is about two miles northeast of St Austell. Carne Farm, Trethurgy is the birthplace of Silvanus Trevail, a president of the Society of Architects and the architect of many well known Cornish hotels such as the Headland Hotel, Newquay and the Carbis Bay Hotel, Carbis Bay.

References

Villages in Cornwall